Tokyo Fever (トーキョーフィーバー) is the 27th single by Japanese hip-hop trio Lead. It was their first single after their seventh studio album The Showcase to bring in their new era, Milestone. The single charted well on Oricon, ranking at No. 5, keeping their run of top releases, and remained on the charts for three weeks.

The single was released on March 8, 2017, a year-and-a-half after their previous single Yakusoku, which had been released in November 2015.

Information
Tokyo Fever (トーキョーフィーバー) is the twenty-seventh single by Japanese hip-hop trio Lead. Keeping inline with their chart-topping releases, which began with Wanna Be With You in early 2012, Tokyo Fever became their ninth consecutive single to chart in the top five and took the No. 5 spot on the Oricon Singles Charts, remaining on the charts for three consecutive weeks.

The single was released in four editions: a standard CD and three limited CD+DVD renditions. Each of the CD+DVD editions carried a different b-side. All editions carried the title track and the coupling track "Bokura no Yogaakeru Made" (僕らの夜が明けるまで / Until Our Night is Over), along with their corresponding instrumentals. Type A, which had a turquoise backdrop, carried the bonus track "Funkenstein" (stylized as FUNKENSTEIN), its corresponding instrumental and the music video for "Tokyo Fever." Type B, which featured a yellow backdrop, contained the bonus track "Dilemma," its corresponding instrumental and the dance version of "Tokyo Fever." Type C, which had a pink backdrop, carried the bonus track "Gimme a call," its corresponding instrumental and a dance tutorial video for "Tokyo Fever."

For "Tokyo Fever," the lyrics were written by Saeki Yuusuke and Japanese duo CLARABELL, with the rap portions written by Lead's rapper Shinya Taniuchi. "Bokura no Yogaakeru Made" lyrics were written by PALEO with the music written by BOY SKI MASK, DEY GON GET IT, along with PALEO. "Funkenstein" was written and composed by Keita Furuya and Shinya Taniuchi. The composition was done by Christian Hoff, DWB and Aileen De La Cruz. "Dilemma" was written and composed by Shinya, becoming his personal project. "Gimme a call" was written by Denis Seo, Shin Seung-Ik and Neil. The lyrical portion was written by the youngest member of Lead, Akira Kagimoto.

Background and composition
"Tokyo Fever" was composed by the Japanese music producing duo CLARABELL, as were the instrumentals. The lyrics were written by Saeki Yuusuke (also known by his stage name 佐伯youthK or Saeki youthK) and CLARABELL, with the rap portions written by Lead's rapper Shinya Taniuchi. One of CLARABELL's more famous credits was on Japanese singer-songwriter Kumi Koda's song "Go to the Top," which had charted at No. 1 on the Oricon Singles Charts in 2012. CLARABELL have also worked predominantly with Japanese collective girl group E-girls.

The lyrics of "Bokura no Yogaakeru Made" were written by PALEO with the music written by BOY SKI MASK, DEY GON GET IT, along with PALEO. "Funkenstein" was a collaborative effort for the lyrics and production with members Keita Furuya and Shinya Taniuchi. The composition was done by Christian Hoff, DWB and Aileen De La Cruz. "Dilemma" was written and composed by Shinya, becoming his personal project. "Gimme a call" was written by Denis Seo, Shin Seung-Ik and Neil. The lyrical portion was written by the youngest member of Lead, Akira Kagimoto.

Track listing

Charts

References

External links
Lead Official Site

2017 singles
2017 songs
Songs about Tokyo
Japanese-language songs
Pony Canyon singles
Lead (band) songs